Paul Friedrich Theodore Miersch (January 18, 1868 in Dresden – March 1, 1956 in New York City) was a German-born American composer; he came to the United States and settled in New York in 1892.  From 1893 till 1898, he was a solo cellist of the New York Symphony Orchestra.  Among his compositions were concertos for violin and for cello, among other orchestral works.  He also composed chamber music, including a string quartet, and songs.

References

External links

1868 births
American male classical composers
1956 deaths
German emigrants to the United States
American classical composers
19th-century American composers
19th-century classical composers
American classical cellists
Musicians from Dresden
19th-century male musicians